The 2017 Liga 3 season was the 2nd season of lower-tier and the inaugural season of the third-tier competition in Indonesia with the new name Liga 3.

Persatu Tuban, winner of the 2014 Liga Nusantara are the defending champions, as the 2015 Liga Nusantara was not held and the 2016 ISC Liga Nusantara was not counted as an official league.

Blitar United won the title after a 2–1 win over Persik Kendal in 2017 Liga 3 Final at Gelora Bumi Kartini Stadium, Jepara on 17 December 2017.

Format

National round took place in several provinces that have been determined by PT Liga Indonesia Baru with the following format:
 Play-off round contains 24 teams divided into eight groups. The winner from each group advanced to the National round.
 National round contains 32 teams divided into eight groups. Two teams from each group advanced to the knockout round.

Teams

Each Provincial Association held their Provincial League (Regional round) followed by unlimited teams and the winner advanced to National round or Play-off round. Each Provincial Association only given 1 to 4 representatives to the National round or Play-off round based on rate of their Provincial League competitiveness. Regional round start at 12 April 2017 in Central Java Province.

Regional round winners

Play-off round
There are 24 teams entered this round divided into 8 groups and played on 28 November-1 December 2017. The winners from each group advanced to National round.

Group 1
All matches were held in Citarum Stadium, Semarang.

|}

Group 2
All matches were held in Citarum Stadium, Semarang.

|}

Group 3
All matches were held in Kebon Dalem Stadium, Kendal.

|}

Group 4
All matches were held in Kebon Dalem Stadium, Kendal.

|}

Group 5
All matches were held in Wergu Wetan Stadium, Kudus.

|}

Group 6
All matches were held in Wergu Wetan Stadium, Kudus.

|}

Group 7
All matches were held in Gelora Bumi Kartini Stadium, Jepara.

|}

Group 8
All matches were held in Gelora Bumi Kartini Stadium, Jepara.

|}

National round
There are 24 teams (+8 teams from Play-off round) entered this round and played on 3–17 December 2017 at Central Java.

Group stage

Group A
All matches were held in Citarum Stadium, Semarang.

|}

Group B
All matches were held in Citarum Stadium, Semarang.

|}

Group C
All matches were held in Kebon Dalem Stadium, Kendal.

|}

Group D
All matches were held in Kebon Dalem Stadium, Kendal.

|}

Group E
All matches were held in Wergu Wetan Stadium, Kudus.

|}

Group F
All matches were held in Wergu Wetan Stadium, Kudus.

|}

Group G
All matches were held in Gelora Bumi Kartini Stadium, Jepara.

|}

Group H
All matches were held in Gelora Bumi Kartini Stadium, Jepara.

|}

Knockout phase

Round of 16

|}

Quarter-finals

|}

Semi-finals

|}

Third-place

|}

Final

|}

Champions

Awards
 Best Player: Assanur Rijal (Aceh United)
 Top Scorer: Arianto (Aceh United)

See also
 2017 Liga 1
 2017 Liga 2

References

Third tier Indonesian football league seasons
3
Indonesia
Indonesia